George Baldwin Smith (May 22, 1823September 18, 1879) was an American lawyer and Democratic politician.  He was the 4th Attorney General of Wisconsin, and the 3rd and 16th mayor of Madison, Wisconsin.

Legal and political career

Smith was admitted to the federal bar in to Southport, Wisconsin Territory, (present-day Kenosha, Wisconsin) in 1843. In 1845, he moved to the territorial capital of Madison, where he was appointed district attorney for Dane County in January 1846. He served in this role until 1852. He was elected to represent Dane County at the 1846 Wisconsin Constitutional Convention.

Smith was elected Attorney General of Wisconsin in 1853, serving from 1854 to 1856; he declined a re-nomination in 1855. After leaving office, his name was drawn into the scandal involving the fraudulent re-election of William A. Barstow in 1855.

He then served as mayor of Madison from 1858 to 1861. He represented the city in the Wisconsin State Assembly in 1859, 1864, and 1869. The Democratic Party selected him as their candidate to run for his district's congressional seat in 1864 and 1872, but he failed to win both times. Smith was also the unsuccessful Democratic candidate for Senate in 1869, losing to Matthew H. Carpenter.

In 1876 he helped to supervise the canvass of electoral votes in Louisiana in the heavily-disputed 1876 presidential election. He was re-elected as mayor of Madison in April 1878, and served until just a few months before his death, in Madison, in 1879.

Personal life and education
Smith was born in Parma Corners, New York to Reuben Smith and Betsy Page Smith; his mother died ten weeks after his birth. His family moved to Cleveland, Ohio, in 1825, then to Medina, Ohio, in 1827. Smith studied law with attorneys in Medina and Cleveland before moving with his father to Wisconsin in 1843.

Smith married Eugenia Weed in 1844. They had five children, two of whom survived to adulthood: James and Anna.

Electoral history

Wisconsin Attorney General (1853)

| colspan="6" style="text-align:center;background-color: #e9e9e9;"| General Election, November 8, 1853

Madison Mayor (1858)

| colspan="6" style="text-align:center;background-color: #e9e9e9;"| General Election, March 1, 1858

Wisconsin Assembly Dane 6th District (1858)

| colspan="6" style="text-align:center;background-color: #e9e9e9;"| General Election, November 2, 1858

Madison Mayor (1859, 1860)

| colspan="6" style="text-align:center;background-color: #e9e9e9;"| General Election, March 7, 1859

| colspan="6" style="text-align:center;background-color: #e9e9e9;"| General Election, April 3, 1860

Wisconsin Assembly Dane 5th District (1863)

| colspan="6" style="text-align:center;background-color: #e9e9e9;"| General Election, November 3, 1863

U.S. House of Representatives (1864)

| colspan="6" style="text-align:center;background-color: #e9e9e9;"| General Election, November 8, 1864

Wisconsin Assembly Dane 5th District (1868)

| colspan="6" style="text-align:center;background-color: #e9e9e9;"| General Election, November 3, 1868

U.S. House of Representatives (1872)

| colspan="6" style="text-align:center;background-color: #e9e9e9;"| General Election, November 5, 1872

Madison Mayor (1878)

| colspan="6" style="text-align:center;background-color: #e9e9e9;"| General Election, April 2, 1878

References

External links

 

1823 births
1879 deaths
People from Parma, New York
Lawyers from Madison, Wisconsin
Democratic Party members of the Wisconsin State Assembly
Wisconsin Attorneys General
Mayors of Madison, Wisconsin
District attorneys in Wisconsin
19th-century American politicians
19th-century American lawyers